Lidia Vitale (born 12 October 1972) is an Italian actress. She appeared in more than fifty films since 2000.

Selected filmography

References

External links 

1972 births
Living people
Italian film actresses